Gymnobela virgulata is a species of sea snail, a marine gastropod mollusk in the family Raphitomidae.

Description
The length of the shell attains 26.5 mm.

Distribution
This marine species occurs off the Marquesas.

References

 Sysoev, A. & Bouchet, P., 2001. New and uncommon turriform gastropods (Gastropoda: Conoidea) from the south-west Pacific. Mémoires du Muséum national d'Histoire naturelle 185: 271-320

External links
 MNHN, Paris: holotype
 Gastropods.com: Gymnobela virgulata
 

virgulata
Gastropods described in 2001